Roger Bocquet (9 April 1921 – 10 March 1994) was a Swiss footballer during the 1940s and 1950s. He played as a half-back and was a participant at the 1950 FIFA World Cup and 1954 FIFA World Cup. He insisted on playing during the 1954 World Cup (and played all four matches) despite suffering from a brain tumour. He was later operated on and recovered.

Bocquet won 48 caps for Switzerland in total and scored 2 goals. He played his club football for the Lausanne Sports Club.

He died in March 1994.

References

Official FIFA page

1921 births
1994 deaths
Swiss men's footballers
Switzerland international footballers
1950 FIFA World Cup players
1954 FIFA World Cup players
Footballers from Geneva
FC Lausanne-Sport players
Association football defenders
Swiss football managers
FC Lausanne-Sport managers